Battlefield: Bad Company  is a first-person shooter developed by DICE for the PlayStation 3 and Xbox 360, and part of the Battlefield series. It was released in North America on 23 June 2008, followed by a European release on 26 June. The game was hinted at just before the release of Battlefield 2, and announced sixteen months later. A direct sequel, Battlefield: Bad Company 2, was released for the PlayStation 3, Xbox 360 and Windows on 2 March 2010. The player controls protagonist Private Preston Marlowe and his exploits to steal gold from mercenaries along with his squad, in the midst of a war between the United States and Russia.

Bad Company is unique in the series in that it was developed for consoles and features a full single player campaign with characters, as opposed to previous titles which were mostly released for Windows and featured warfare focused on multiplayer with large numbers of players. The game also emphasises squad-based combat, while retaining the vehicular and large scale warfare of the series in multiplayer. The game applies some new features to the franchise, including a highly destructible environment such as blowing walls through houses. DICE debuted its studio developed Frostbite engine with the game which allows for the high destructibility, and the engine has since been updated to run later titles.

Bad Company received mostly positive reviews from critics, who praised the story's humor and technical aspects such as sound, atmosphere and the game engine.

Gameplay

In the game, players can hold one primary weapon which each has its own secondary, along with a combat knife, grenades and other picked up explosives and devices. Players start with 100 health, which is reduced by damage. Wounded players heal by using the LIFE-2 auto-injector. The environment is almost entirely destructible, but bullets cannot go through most walls. The ammunition system uses a bullet calculator, shown on the HUD, and players can endlessly repair vehicles with power tools unless they are completely destroyed. Airstrikes and Mortar Strikes can also be utilized.

Battlefield: Bad Company has an assortment of military vehicles from each of the game's three factions that can be used by the player. Tanks, infantry fighting vehicles, armored cars, attack helicopters, patrol boats, mobile anti-aircraft weapon system. Unlike some previous versions in the Battlefield series, fixed-wing aircraft such as fighter jets and bomber planes are not available in this game.

The Frostbite game engine allows 90% of the environment to be destroyed, including buildings, vegetation (including trees, grass, and bushes), vehicles, other players and the ground itself. For gameplay purposes, the frames of some buildings and objects remain indestructible to prevent total destruction of key points and to prevent the map from being completely flat. Additionally, the game features dynamic lighting to correlate with the changing environment.

Multiplayer

Multiplayer supports up to 24 players. Gold Rush was the only multiplayer mode included in the initial release of Battlefield: Bad Company. The setup of the game is an Attackers vs. Defenders scenario. The eight initial maps are Harvest Day, Over and Out, End of the Line, Ascension, Valley Run, Deconstruction, Oasis, and Final Ignition, each with destructible environments, certain atmospheres, and vehicles. One team must defend two crates filled with gold while the other team attempts to destroy the crates. Once the crates are destroyed, more of the map is available to fight on with new crates appearing, along with added reinforcement numbers. The attacking team has a limited amount of respawns to achieve their goal of capturing the 3-5 gold stashes either by setting charges or simply destroying the two crates of gold at each base. The defending team has an unlimited amount of respawns available, but their goal is to exhaust the attacking teams respawns.

The Conquest game mode returned to Bad Company due to overwhelming requests from players during the beta testing. Conquest was the prevalent game-mode in many of the preceding Battlefield games, and involves reducing the opponents' "ticket" meter by scoring kills and capturing strategically placed flags. This mode was available as a free download post-launch, the release date was 7 August 2008. The Conquest pack included modified versions of the Ascension, End of the Line, Oasis and Harvest Day maps.

A new map pack featuring more conquest maps, and trophies for both offline and online play on the PlayStation 3 version, was released on 30 October 2008, and the Xbox 360 version releasing on 31 October 2008. The maps included 4 modified singleplayer maps such as Acta non Verba, Ghost Town, Par for the Course, and Crossing Over.

The game has 25 ranks, each from the U.S. Army (corporal, sergeant, colonel etc.). Unlock credits may be obtained by ranking up and then the aforementioned credits may be used to unlock weapons. However, the weapons included with the Find All Five program may not be unlocked using these credits. Unlock credits are not granted with every rank. A particular selection of five weapons may be unlocked only by ranking up to Rank 25 or by purchasing the Gold Edition.

Players can earn different types of awards. Trophies are awarded for multiple kills in a certain class, kills to defend an objective and for other team-related actions. These can be awarded to the player multiple times during the game. Patches can be earned for gaining certain trophies and then completing certain criteria in an online match. Patches can only be awarded once to a player. Wildcards are awarded once to a player for a combination of many different criteria. These are harder than trophies and patches to unlock. In addition to these in-game awards, the game is compatible with achievements for the Xbox 360 and trophies for the PlayStation 3.

In a move similar to Battlefield 2142, the number of soldier classes is small compared to previous games in the series, resulting in a combination of the classic soldier classes. The classes in this game are: 
Assault, an all-around good soldier class, armed with an assault rifle, a 40 mm grenade launcher and the ability to heal himself
Demolition, an anti-vehicle soldier equipped with a shotgun, a rocket launcher, and anti-vehicle land mines
Recon, a long range class with a sniper rifle, a handgun, a throwable motion sensor and guided smart bomb
Specialist, a close-range class with a suppressed submachine gun and C4 for destroying objects and environments that can be destroyed, or vehicles such as tanks and armored cars.
Support, an anti-personnel class with a light machine gun, large ammo capacity, healing equipment for soldiers and vehicles, and an unlockable mortar strike device to call in a bombardment on a particular area.

Each class wields a main weapon of choice (maximum of five optional guns per class), three secondary weapons/gadgets, and a knife for quick kills. With a knife one can rank up faster than with any other weapon, since one receives both the standard points for a kill as well as the slain player's dog tags (which grant a hefty point bonus, depending on their level).

Plot

Setting
The game is set in the near future and focuses on the fictional First Russo-American War between the United States and Russian Federation, mainly in the fictional country of Serdaristan. It follows a four-man fireteam from "B" Company of the 222nd Army battalion, commonly called "Bad Company", composed of troublemakers whose use in the battlefield is limited to the role of cannon fodder. Private Preston Marlowe (David Menkin) is the game's protagonist, newly transferred to the company. The more intelligent but nervous Private Terrence Sweetwater (Richard Lynson) serves as a foil to Private George Gordon Haggard Jr. (Nigel Whitmey), a pyromaniac and the comic relief of the story. Sergeant Samuel D. Redford (Bruce Johnson) is the leader of the team. He is the first ever to volunteer for his position, in exchange for shortening his term of service and has only three days left to serve. The campaign takes place in the fictional Caucasian country of Serdaristan, and a fictional Middle Eastern city called Sadiz near the Caspian Sea.

Story
Preston Marlowe is a U.S. soldier transferred to Bad Company and embarks on his first mission with his new squad. After a rather informal introduction to fellow squadmates, Redford, Sweetwater and Haggard, they begin by seizing Russian artillery positions and turning the guns on advancing enemy armor. Proceeding to knock out several anti-air batteries, clearing the way for advancing armor and taking control of the city of Zabograd, the group stumble upon a Legionnaire encampment: mercenaries whose leader is The Legionnaire (Nathan Osgood), a ruthless commander. The Legionnaires are possibly the deadliest army in the world, according to Sweetwater, who also mentions how each is paid in solid gold bars. Transported to a dock farther away from the U.S. Army, they spot more Legionnaires loading a supply truck with gold. The truck ends up driving past the border into nearby Serdaristan, a neutral state in the conflict. Despite Redford ordering the squad to withdraw from the area, Haggard, excited over the prospect of getting gold, runs after the trucks, single-handedly invading a neutral country.

The squad pursues Haggard to stop him from causing further damage. When they find him, mission coordinator Mike-One-Juliet (Jennifer Woodward) calls Redford, stating that he would be subject to a court martial for Haggard's offense, as well as raising his service time. Since they have no other choice but to run, Redford flippantly suggests that they pursue the gold even further to a harbor and a ship that is loaded with gold. The group fight their way there only to get caught by U.S. forces. The Army agrees that the squad will have their charges dropped if they investigate Serdaristan, since they are officially AWOL, removing U.S. liability. The squad's orders are to capture the eccentric dictator of Serdaristan, Zavomir Serdar (Stefan Ashton Frank). Soon Serdaristan is considered at war after shooting down the squad's UH-60 Black Hawk transport helicopter, and the group advance to the dictator's palace by way of his personal golf course, where he tells them that the Legionnaires had invaded in order to pay for his bill. As they attempt to escape, they are informed that the U.S. Army is severing all ties with them and they must find their own way out. The squad escapes with Serdar on his golden Mil Mi-24 helicopter, pursued by the Legionnaires.

Serdar reluctantly directs them to Serdaristan's military nexus, where the helicopter is used to destroy an oil refinery and the country's internet service station. After a long flight, the helicopter is shot down by a black Ka-52 helicopter in Russia. Preston wakes up alone and, with help from Mike-One-Juliet, is reunited with his squad at a monastery. Serdar, however, was captured and the squad saves him from execution by the Legionnaires. Escaping in a boat, they leave Serdar on a small, isolated island as the exile he was seeking and arrive in Sadiz, a city under construction somewhere on the Caspian Sea. On the beach, the squad spots the ship they saw earlier in Serdaristan. Advancing past resistance, they learn that the U.S. Army is also mounting an offensive there and fear competition for the gold. They then make a deal to share some of the gold with Mike-One-Juliet in exchange for mission support.

After slowing down the U.S. Army's offensive by blowing up two bridges, the squad reaches a gold-filled garage but is attacked by the Legionnaire leader in his personal Ka-52, the same helicopter from before. Preston manages to shoot down The Legionnaire and the squad returns to the gold, only to find the U.S. Army loading it into supply trucks. Presuming defeat, they are spotted by the commanding officer. Preston convinces him that they are Army operatives, and the officer orders them to take a truck of the gold and join the convoy. The squad happily obliges, but sneak out of the convoy with their truck. Meanwhile, at the Ka-52 crash site, The Legionnaire rises from the burning wreckage, seemingly unhurt, with a vengeful expression.

Development

Promotion
Three trailers were released for Bad Company, each parodying popular video game series. The first trailer parodied Metal Gear Solid 4: Guns of the Patriots called "Snake Eyes", the second parodied Gears of War and the song "Mad World" called "Bad World" and the third parodied Rainbow Six Vegas 2 called "Rainbow Sprinkles".

Release
"Find All Five" is a way for players to unlock specific weapons. The game's official website includes promotional events that give the player codes for unlockable weapons. These "Find All Five" weapons include the F2000 Belgian assault rifle, USAS-12 automatic shotgun, M60 general purpose machine gun, QBU-88 sniper rifle and silenced Uzi sub-machine gun.

The five events from EA's website instructed users to participate in the Battlefield Veteran's program, check the player's stats online after playing the game, register for the BF newsletter, pre-order the game through participating stores, and get to rank 4 in the demo.

Upon learning about this system, many players were angered as it meant that a potential in-game advantage would be given to players willing to pay extra money for pre-orders, or share their personal information when signing up for the newsletter.

On 11 September 2008, Battlefield: Bad Company'''s website revealed that three of the Find All Five codes would be released due to lack of availability. These three guns were the QBU-88 Sniper Rifle, M60 Light Machine Gun and the Silenced Mini Uzi Sub-Machine Gun. The USAS12 Full-Automatic Shotgun code was leaked later. The F2000 Assault Rifle is being withheld as an exclusive weapon for veterans of the series.

ReceptionBattlefield: Bad Company received positive reviews. Professional reviews for the game have been very positive. A large portion of praise went to the game's realistically destructible environments, impressive weapons, variety of gameplay and vehicles, and its "extraordinary" multiplayer gameplay. Criticism was mainly on a sluggish opening and graphics.IGN noted several flaws in the game, but still gave the game a very positive score of 8.6. Giant Bomb gave it a 5/5 saying, "It looks great, has fun characters, a load of interesting weaponry, and works nicely whether you're playing alone or with a squad."Official PlayStation Magazine gave 90 score noting "It's not the best-looking game, it's clunky in its controls, but it delivers where it counts with a fun experience that will keep you entertained through to its conclusion". GameSpot praised the game with a score of 8.5 "Great" noting "Battlefield Bad Company is the most fun, addictive shooter released so far this year". 1UP criticized the game's poor AI with an average score "75" saying "With a thumping sound and sudden cloud of dust, grenades erase whole sections of houses. Bullets, however, stop dead in the thinnest wood slat. But what Bad Company needs isn't a trip to a real-life firing range  it's its inflexible A.I. that requires the lessons".

Sequel

EA released Battlefield: Bad Company 2'' in 2010.

References

External links

2008 video games
Asymmetrical multiplayer video games
 05
Electronic Arts games
First-person shooters
Frostbite (game engine) games
Multiplayer and single-player video games
PlayStation 3 games
Video games developed in Sweden
Video games set in Europe
Video games set in Russia
Video games set in a fictional country
Video games set in the Middle East
Xbox 360 games
Video games using Havok